This is a list of municipalities of Denmark which have standing links to local communities in other countries known as "town twinning" (usually in Europe) or "sister cities" (usually in the rest of the world).

A
Aabenraa
 Kaltenkirchen, Germany

Aalborg

 Almere, Netherlands
 Antibes, France
 Büdelsdorf, Germany
 Edinburgh, Scotland, United Kingdom
 Fredrikstad, Norway
 Fuglafjørður, Faroe Islands
 Galway, Ireland
 Gdynia, Poland
 Haifa, Israel
 Hefei, China
 Innsbruck, Austria
 Karlskoga, Sweden
 Lancaster, England
 Lerum, Sweden
 Liperi, Finland
 Norðurþing, Iceland
 Orsa, Sweden
 Orust, Sweden
 Ośno Lubuskie, Poland
 Racine, United States
 Rapperswil-Jona, Switzerland
 Rendalen, Norway
 Rendsburg, Germany
 Riga, Latvia
 Riihimäki, Finland
 Sermersooq, Greenland
 Solvang, United States
 Tulcea, Romania
 Tumakuru district, India
 Varna, Bulgaria
 Vilnius, Lithuania
 Wismar, Germany

Aarhus

 Bergen, Norway
 Gothenburg, Sweden
 Harbin, China
 Kiel, Germany
 Kujalleq, Greenland
 Rostock, Germany
 Turku, Finland

Albertslund

 Borken, Germany
 Dainville, France
 East Renfrewshire, Scotland, United Kingdom
 Grabow, Germany
 Mölndal, Sweden
 Říčany, Czech Republic
 Whitstable, England, United Kingdom

Assens

 Ljusdal, Sweden
 Oeversee, Germany

B
Ballerup

 Brandenburg an der Havel, Germany 
 East Kilbride, Scotland, United Kingdom

Billund
 Hohenwestedt, Germany

Brøndby

 Botkyrka, Sweden
 Dorogomilovo (Moscow), Russia

 Stange, Norway
 Steglitz-Zehlendorf (Berlin), Germany

Brønderslev

 Eidsberg, Norway
 Nässjö, Sweden

C
Copenhagen

 Beijing, China
 Marseille, France

E
Esbjerg

 Ely, England, United Kingdom
 Eskilstuna, Sweden
 Fjarðabyggð, Iceland
 Güstrow, Germany
 Jyväskylä, Finland
 Krems an der Donau, Austria
 Qeqqata, Greenland
 Ratzeburg, Germany
 Stavanger, Norway
 Suzhou, China
 Szczecin, Poland
 Tórshavn, Faroe Islands

F
Fredensborg

 Bad Berleburg, Germany
 Håbo, Sweden
 Ingå, Finland
 Nittedal, Norway
 Paide, Estonia
 Sudbury, England, United Kingdom

Fredericia

 Härnösand, Sweden
 Herford, Germany
 Ilulissat, Greenland
 Kokkola, Finland
 Kristiansund, Norway
 Šiauliai, Lithuania

Frederiksberg

 Bærum, Norway
 Hafnarfjörður, Iceland
 Hämeenlinna, Finland
 Qeqertarsuatsiaat, Greenland
 Tartu, Estonia
 Tórshavn, Faroe Islands
 Uppsala, Sweden

Frederikshavn

 Borlänge, Sweden
 Bremerhaven, Germany
 Larvik, Norway
 Qeqqata, Greenland
 Qingdao, China
 Tranås, Sweden

Frederikssund

 Aurskog-Høland, Norway
 Catoira, Spain
 Kowary, Poland
 Kumla, Sweden

 Ramsgate, England, United Kingdom
 Sipoo, Finland
 Somerset, England, United Kingdom

G
Gentofte

 Halmstad, Sweden
 Hanko, Finland
 Sermersooq, Greenland
 Stord, Norway

Gladsaxe

 Charlottenburg-Wilmersdorf (Berlin), Germany
 Gagny, France
 Haabersti (Tallinn), Estonia
 Klagenfurt, Austria
 Koszalin, Poland
 Minden, Germany
 Narsaq, Greenland
 Neubrandenburg, Germany
 Paisley, Scotland, United Kingdom
 Pirkkala, Finland
 Ski, Norway
 Solna, Sweden
 Split, Croatia
 Sutton, England, United Kingdom
 Taitō (Tokyo), Japan
 Veszprém, Hungary

Glostrup

 Kotka, Finland
 Landskrona, Sweden

Guldborgsund

 Eutin, Germany
 Iisalmi, Finland
 Liepāja, Latvia
 Rostock, Germany

H
Haderslev

 Braine, France

 Sandefjord, Norway
 Uusikaupunki, Finland
 Varberg, Sweden
 Wittenberg, Germany

Helsingør

 Harstad, Norway
 Rueil-Malmaison, France
 Sanremo, Italy
 Umeå, Sweden
 Uummannaq, Greenland
 Vaasa, Finland

Herlev

 Eberswalde, Germany
 Gniewkowo, Poland
 Höganäs, Sweden
 Lieto, Finland
 Nesodden, Norway
 Seltjarnarnes, Iceland

Herning

 Arsuk, Greenland
 Countryside, Åland Islands, Finland
 Eiði, Faroe Islands
 Holmestrand, Norway
 Husby, Germany
 Kangasala, Finland
 Siglufjörður, Iceland
 Vänersborg, Sweden

Hillerød
 Kladovo, Serbia

Høje-Taastrup

 Ängelholm, Sweden
 Oldenburg, Germany
 Valmiera, Latvia

Holstebro is a member of the Douzelage, a town twinning association of towns across the European Union. Holstebro also has one other twin town.

Douzelage
 Agros, Cyprus
 Altea, Spain
 Asikkala, Finland
 Bad Kötzting, Germany
 Bellagio, Italy
 Bundoran, Ireland
 Chojna, Poland
 Granville, France
 Houffalize, Belgium
 Judenburg, Austria
 Kőszeg, Hungary
 Marsaskala, Malta
 Meerssen, Netherlands
 Niederanven, Luxembourg
 Oxelösund, Sweden
 Preveza, Greece
 Rokiškis, Lithuania
 Rovinj, Croatia
 Sesimbra, Portugal
 Sherborne, England, United Kingdom
 Sigulda, Latvia
 Siret, Romania
 Škofja Loka, Slovenia
 Sušice, Czech Republic
 Tryavna, Bulgaria
 Türi, Estonia
 Zvolen, Slovakia
Other
 Brașov, Romania

Horsens

 Blönduós, Iceland
 Chengdu, China
 Karlstad, Sweden
 Moss, Norway
 Nokia, Finland

Hørsholm

 Leksand, Sweden
 Lillehammer, Norway
 Oulainen, Finland

Hvidovre

 Oppegård, Norway
 Rydułtowy, Poland
 Sollentuna, Sweden
 Tuusula, Finland

I
Ishøj

 Bad Salzungen, Germany
 Cihanbeyli, Turkey
 Haninge, Sweden
 Svedala, Sweden
 Trzebinia, Poland
 Waalre, Netherlands

J
Jammerbugt

 Lindesberg, Sweden
 Oppdal, Norway
 Strzelce Krajeńskie, Poland
 Tongzhou (Beijing), China
 Tornesch, Germany

K
Kolding

 Anjō, Japan
 Delmenhorst, Germany
 Drammen, Norway
 Huéscar, Spain
 Kujalleq, Greenland
 Lappeenranta, Finland
 Örebro, Sweden
 Panevėžys, Lithuania
 Pisa, Italy
 Stykkishólmur, Iceland
 Szombathely, Hungary
 Wuqing (Tianjin), China

L
Langeland

 Keuruu, Finland
 Skaun, Norway
 Tingsryd, Sweden

M
Mariagerfjord

 Bábolna, Hungary
 Bolesławiec, Poland
 Kokemäki, Finland
 Lier, Norway
 Falköping, Sweden

Middelfart

 Barmstedt, Germany
 Korsholm, Finland
 Mandal, Norway
 Oskarshamn, Sweden

N
Næstved is a member of the Charter of European Rural Communities, a town twinning association across the European Union. Næstved also has four other twin towns.

Charter of European Rural Communities
 Bienvenida, Spain
 Bièvre, Belgium
 Bucine, Italy
 Cashel, Ireland
 Cissé, France
 Desborough, England, United Kingdom
 Esch (Haaren), Netherlands
 Hepstedt, Germany
 Ibănești, Romania
 Kandava (Tukums), Latvia
 Kannus, Finland
 Kolindros, Greece
 Lassee, Austria
 Medzev, Slovakia
 Moravče, Slovenia
 Nagycenk, Hungary
 Nadur, Malta
 Ockelbo, Sweden
 Pano Lefkara, Cyprus
 Põlva, Estonia
 Samuel (Soure), Portugal
 Slivo Pole, Bulgaria
 Starý Poddvorov, Czech Republic
 Strzyżów, Poland
 Tisno, Croatia
 Troisvierges, Luxembourg
 Žagarė (Joniškis), Lithuania
Other
 Gävle, Sweden
 Gjøvik, Norway
 Rauma, Finland
 Sopot, Poland

Nordfyn

 Naantali, Finland
 Svelvik, Norway
 Vadstena, Sweden

O
Odder

 Katrineholm, Sweden
 Salo, Finland
 Vennesla, Norway

Odense

 Columbus, United States
 Funabashi, Japan
 Groningen, Netherlands
 Iksan, South Korea
 İzmir, Turkey
 Katowice, Poland
 Kaunas, Lithuania
 Kyiv, Ukraine
 Klaksvík, Faroe Islands
 Kópavogur, Iceland
 Norrköping, Sweden
 Östersund, Sweden
 Schwerin, Germany
 Shaoxing, China
 St Albans, England, United Kingdom
 Tampere, Finland
 Trondheim, Norway
 Upernavik, Greenland

R
Randers

 Akureyri, Iceland
 Ålesund, Norway
 Jelenia Góra, Poland
 Lahti, Finland
 Västerås, Sweden

Rebild

 Gelenau, Germany
 Jiaxing, China

Ringsted

 Gyöngyös, Hungary
 Halden, Norway
 Kutná Hora, Czech Republic
 Ringsted, United States
 Sastamala, Finland
 Skövde, Sweden

Roskilde terminated all its twinnings.

Rudersdal

 Asker, Norway
 Eslöv, Sweden
 Garðabær, Iceland
 Jakobstad, Finland

S
Silkeborg terminated all its twinnings.

Skanderborg
 Eisenach, Germany

Skive

 Arvika, Sweden
 Kongsvinger, Norway
 Qasigiannguit, Greenland
 Ylöjärvi, Finland

Slagelse

 Dargun, Germany
 Kragerø, Norway

 Police, Poland
 Vihti, Finland
 Wenzhou, China

Sorø

 Eidsvoll, Norway
 Fljótsdalshérað, Iceland
 Pruszcz, Poland
 Skara, Sweden

Stevns

 Höör, Sweden
 Laukaa, Finland
 Modum, Norway
 Östra Göinge, Sweden

Struer

 Forssa, Finland
 Sarpsborg, Norway
 Södertälje, Sweden

Svendborg

 Aasiaat, Greenland
 Bodø, Norway
 Dolný Kubín, Slovakia
 Jönköping, Sweden
 Kuopio, Finland
 Stralsund, Germany

T
Tårnby

 Alingsås, Sweden
 Lillestrøm, Norway

Thisted

 Baja, Hungary
 Jõhvi, Estonia
 Loimaa, Finland
 Mosfellsbær, Iceland
 Uddevalla, Sweden
 Skien, Norway

V
Vejle

 Borås, Sweden
 Jelgava, Latvia
 Mikkeli, Finland
 Molde, Norway
 Schleswig, Germany

Vesthimmerlands

 Lapinlahti, Finland
 Rana, Norway
 Sigulda, Latvia
 Skellefteå, Sweden

Viborg

 Dalvíkurbyggð, Iceland
 Hamar, Norway

 Lund, Sweden
 Lüneburg, Germany
 Marijampolė, Lithuania
 Porvoo, Finland

References

Denmark
Lists of populated places in Denmark
Foreign relations of Denmark
Cities and towns in Denmark